Elections to Barrow-in-Furness Borough Council were held on 10 June 2004. One third of the council was up for election and the Labour party kept overall control of the council. 

After the election, the composition of the council was
Labour 24
Conservative 12
Independent 2

Election result

Ward results

References
2004 Barrow-in-Furness election result
 Ward results

2004 English local elections
2004
2000s in Cumbria